Viorel Sălceanu (born 1 March 1946) is a Romanian former football midfielder.

International career
Viorel Sălceanu played two games for Romania's Olympic team at the 1972 Summer Olympics qualifiers.

Honours
Politehnica Iași
Divizia B: 1967–68
Dinamo București
Divizia A: 1970–71, 1972–73, 1974–75
Cupa României: 1967–68

References

External links
Viorel Sălceanu at Labtof.ro

1946 births
Living people
Romanian footballers
Olympic footballers of Romania
Association football midfielders
Liga I players
Liga II players
FCV Farul Constanța players
FC Dinamo București players
FC Politehnica Iași (1945) players
People from Pașcani